Pulse Pounders is a 1988 American anthology film directed by Charles Band. The film is composed of three 30-minute films, two of which are sequels to The Dungeonmaster and Trancers. The third is an adaptation of H. P. Lovecraft's "The Evil Clergyman". Pulse Pounders was originally shot during 1987 and 1988 with the intention of being released, but was shelved due to the collapse of Empire Pictures.

A workprint of Pulse Pounders was discovered in 2011 and was digitally restored. The Evil Clergyman segment received its world premiere at a showing at the Chicago Flashback Weekend. The movie received mostly positive reviews. HorrorNews.net stated that the movie was a "must-watch for any Re-Animator fan" but that it "doesn't quite live up to Re-Animator". The Evil Clergyman was later released as a DVD by Full Moon Pictures in October 2012.

The Trancers segment received its world premiere with the launch of Full Moon Streaming with the title Trancers: City of Lost Angels on September 6, 2013. It was later released on DVD in November. The Dungeonmaster segment was also planned to be released on the streaming channel, where all three segments were shown as the original Pulse Pounders anthology.

References

External links

1988 films
Films based on works by H. P. Lovecraft
Films directed by Charles Band
American science fiction horror films
1980s science fiction horror films
American horror anthology films
Films based on short fiction
Fantasy anthology films
1980s English-language films
1980s American films